The Bishop Road Site in Campbell County, Wyoming is an archeological site along Piney Creek. It was discovered during surveys for a proposed coal slurry pipeline. The site contained buried lithic artifacts, bone fragments and hearths. Projectile points characteristic of the Late Archaic and Late Prehistoric periods were found, with possible early and middle Archaic points as well.

References

External links
Bishop Road SIte at the Wyoming State Historic Preservation Office

Archaeological sites on the National Register of Historic Places in Wyoming
Geography of Campbell County, Wyoming
National Register of Historic Places in Campbell County, Wyoming